Megachile remotissima is a species of bee in the family Megachilidae. It was described by Theodore Dru Alison Cockerell in 1926.

References

Remotissima
Insects described in 1926